Cansado is a coastal town in north-western Mauritania on the Ras Nouadhibou peninsula.  It is located in the Nouadhibou Department in the Dakhlet Nouadhibou region.

It was built from scratch in the early 1960s for the staff administering the port and railhead for the iron ore mining company MIFERMA (Societe Anonyme des Mines de Fer de Mauritanie) as part of their iron mine development project at Zouérate.

Nearby towns and villages include Uad Guenifa, La Batterie(), Nouadhibou, Bir Gandus, Tanoudert and Iouik.

See also 
 Railway stations in Mauritania

Further reading

External links
Modernism in Cansado, Mauritania - 1966, Architectural Digest

Populated places in Mauritania
Dakhlet Nouadhibou Region
Populated coastal places in Mauritania
1960s establishments in Mauritania